Grenelefe is an unincorporated community and census-designated place located in Polk County, Florida, United States. Its population was 2,495 as of the 2020 census.

Geography

Demographics

References

Unincorporated communities in Santa Rosa County, Florida
Unincorporated communities in Florida
Census-designated places in Santa Rosa County, Florida
Census-designated places in Florida